Kristal Yush (married name Kostiew; born January 8, 1982) is an American hammer thrower. She finished fourth in the women's hammer throw event at the 2007 Pan American Games.

External links 

 
 Profile at trackfield.brinkster.net

1982 births
Living people
American female hammer throwers
Athletes (track and field) at the 2007 Pan American Games
Sportspeople from Concord, New Hampshire
University of Vermont alumni
World Athletics Championships athletes for the United States
Pan American Games track and field athletes for the United States
21st-century American women